This is a list of the General Top 100 songs of 2016 in Mexico according to Monitor Latino. Monitor Latino also issued separate year-end charts for Regional Mexican, Pop and Anglo songs.

See also
List of number-one songs of 2016 (Mexico)
List of number-one albums of 2016 (Mexico)

References

2016 in Mexican music
Mexico Top 100
Mexican record charts